The Camino Real de Tierra Adentro, also known as the Silver Route, was a Spanish  road between Mexico City and San Juan Pueblo (Ohkay Owingeh), New Mexico, USA, that was used from 1598 to 1882. It was the northernmost of the four major "royal roads" that linked Mexico City to its major tributaries during and after the Spanish colonial era.

In 2010, 55 sites and five existing UNESCO World Heritage Sites along the Mexican section of the route were collectively added to the World Heritage List, including historic cities, towns, bridges, haciendas and other monuments along the  route between the Historic Center of Mexico City (an independent World Heritage Site) and the town of Valle de Allende, Chihuahua.

The  section of the route within the United States was proclaimed the El Camino Real de Tierra Adentro National Historic Trail, a part of the National Historic Trail system, on October 13, 2000. The historic route is overseen by both the National Park Service and the U.S. Bureau of Land Management with aid from the El Camino Real de Tierra Adentro Trail Association (CARTA). A portion of the trail near San Acacia, New Mexico was listed on the National Register of Historic Places in 2014.

Route

The road is identified as beginning at the Plaza Santo Domingo very close to the present Zócalo and Mexico City Metropolitan Cathedral in Mexico City. Traveling north through San Miguel de Allende, the road's northern terminus was near Santa Fe, New Mexico.

History

Pre-Columbian

Long before Europeans arrived, the various indigenous tribes and kingdoms that had arisen throughout the northern central steppe of Mexico had established the route that would later become the Camino Real de Tierra Adentro as a major thoroughfare for hunting and trading. The route connected the peoples of the Valley of Mexico with those of the north through the exchange of products such as turquoise, obsidian, salt and feathers. By the year AD 1000, a flourishing trade network existed from Mesoamerica to the Rocky Mountains.

European incursion

After Tenochtitlan was subdued in 1521, Spanish conquistadors and colonists began a series of expeditions with the purpose of expanding their domains and obtaining greater wealth for the Spanish Crown. Their initial efforts led them to follow the trails established by the natives who exchanged goods between the north and the south.

In April 1598, a group of military scouts led by Juan de Oñate, the newly appointed colonial governor of the province of Santa Fe de Nuevo México, became lost in the desert south of Paso del Norte while seeking the best route to the Río del Norte. A local Indian they had captured named Mompil drew in the sand a map of the only safe passage to the river. The group arrived at the Río del Norte just south of present-day El Paso and Ciudad Juárez in late April, where they celebrated the Catholic Feast of the Ascension on April 30, before crossing the river. They then mapped and extended the route to what is now Española, where Oñate would establish the capital of the new province. This trail became the Camino Real de Tierra Adentro, the northernmost of the four main "royal roads" – the Caminos Reales – that linked Mexico City to its major tributaries in Acapulco, Veracruz, Audiencia (Guatemala) and Santa Fe.

After the Pueblo Revolt of 1680, which violently forced the Spanish out of Nuevo México, the Spanish Crown decided not to abandon the province altogether but instead maintained a channel to the province so as not to completely abandon their subjects remaining there. The Viceroyalty organized a system, the so-called conducta, to supply the missions, presidios, and northern ranchos. The conducta consisted of wagon caravans that departed every three years from Mexico City to Santa Fe along the Camino Real de Tierra Adentro. The trip required a long and difficult journey of six months, including 2–3 weeks of rest along the way.

Many were the uncertainties that the conducta and other travelers faced. River floods could force weeks of waiting on the banks until the caravan could wade across. At other times, prolonged droughts in the area could make water scarce and difficult to find.

Beyond the sustenance needs, the greatest danger to the caravan was that of local assaults. Groups of bandits roamed throughout the territory and threatened the caravan from the current state of Mexico to the state of Querétaro, seeking articles of value. And from the southern part of Zacatecas onward to the north, the greatest threat was the native Chichimecas, who became more likely to attack as the caravan progressed further north. The main objective of the Chichimecas was horses, but they would also often take women and children. A series of presidios along the way allowed for relays of troops to provide additional protection to the caravans. At night in the most dangerous areas, the caravans would form a circle with their wagons with the people and animals inside.

The Camino Real was actively used as a commercial route for more than 300 years, from the middle of the 16th century to the 19th century, mainly for the transport of silver extracted from northern mines. During this time, the road was continuously improved, and over time the risks became smaller as haciendas and population centers emerged.

18th century

During the 18th century, the sites along the Camino Real de Tierra Adentro increased significantly. The area between the villas of Durango and Santa Fe came to be known as "the Chihuahua Trail". The villa of San Felipe el Real (today city of Chihuahua), established in 1709 to support the surrounding mines, became the most important commercial center and financial area along this segment.

The villa of San Felipe Neri de Alburquerque (present-day Albuquerque, New Mexico) was founded in 1706 and it also became an important terminal. Because of its defensive position on the Camino Real, the Villa de Alburquerque became the center of commercial exchange between Nuevo México and the rest of New Spain during the 18th century, trading cattle, wool, textiles, animal skins, salt, and nuts. This exchange occurred mainly with the mining cities of Chihuahua, Santa Bárbara, and Parral.

El Paso del Norte (present-day Ciudad Juárez) became another major terminal on the route. In 1765, the population of El Paso del Norte was estimated to be 2,635 inhabitants, which created what was then the largest urban center on the northern border of New Spain. El Paso del Norte became an important center of agriculture and rancheria, known for its wines, brandy, vinegar, and raisins.

In the 18th century, the Spanish Crown authorized the establishment of Fairs along the Camino Real to promote commerce (although some form of these had already been existing for some time prior). Some of the most important Fairs along the Camino Real included the Fair de San Juan de los Lagos in Jalisco, the Fair de Saltillo, and the Fair de Chihuahua, which was of great importance to Nuevo México merchants. The Fair de Taos was also an important annual event where the Comanches and the Utes traded weapons, ammunition, horses, agricultural products, furs, and meats with the Spanish. Spain at the same time maintained a monopoly on the products of its northern provinces, thus no trade occurred with the French colony of Louisiana.

For the second half of the 18th century, the northern frontier of New Spain represented a fundamental interest for the Spanish Empire and its reformist policy, with the aim of ensuring Spanish sovereignty over its northern provinces, highly coveted geopolitically by other European powers – especially the English and the French. The Spanish Crown labored to incorporate the natives into the social and economic welfare of its provinces and give them reasons to participate in the defense of the Spanish border.

Thus, Captain Nicolás de Lafora (assigned by the then Marquis of Rubí) gives a description of the frontier of New Spain in his "Viaje a los presidios internos de la América septentrional", the product of an expedition that took place between 1766 and 1768. This expedition was part of a larger commission on the defensive issues and military capabilities entrusted by the Spanish Crown to the Marquis of Rubí, to assess the tactical placement of the Presidios, inspect troop readiness, review military regulations and propose what might be done to strengthen the government and the defense of the State. From its review, the Marquis proposed a line of Presidios along the northern frontier of New Spain, to be established from the Gulf of Mexico to the Gulf of California to protect itself from the Utes, Apaches, Comanches, and Navajos. Don José de Gálvez, special commissioner to New Spain for Charles III, promoted a "Comandancia General de las Provincias Internas" ("General Commander of the Internal Provinces") for the northern provinces of New Spain. However, he also recognized that a long war with the natives would be impossible to win or sustain due to the lack of military resources in the area. With that view, he himself promoted the establishment of a strong peace in the provinces and a greater commercial presence in 1779.

In 1786, the nephew of José de Gálvez, Bernardo de Gálvez, viceroy of New Spain published his "Instructions" which included three strategies for dealing with the Natives: Continuing the military pressure on hostile and unaligned tribes; Pursuing the formation of alliances with friendly tribes; and promoting economic dependency with those natives who had entered into peace treaties with the Spanish Crown.

In the last decade of the 18th century, a tenuous peace was achieved between the Spaniards and the Apache tribes as a result of the aforementioned administrative and strategic changes. As a consequence, commerce along the Camino Real greatly expanded with products from all over the world, including products from the other provinces of New Spain, brought in over land; European products brought in by the Spanish fleet; and even those that came from the Manila galleon that arrived annually at Acapulco from the western Pacific. As an example, for this time, the most typical products sold by the merchants in the city of Parral along the "Chihuahua Trail" included: Platoncillos from Michoacán; Jarrillos from Cuautitlán of the State of Mexico; Majolica from the State of Puebla; Porcelain junks from China; and clay products from Guadalajara.

19th century

The 19th century brought many changes for both Mexico and its northern border. From the Napoleonic Wars to the start of the Mexican War of Independence, the colonial government was unstable and struggled to continue sending resources to the northern provinces. This void led to the establishment of alternate suppliers and supply routes into those provinces. In 1807, American merchant and military agent Zebulon Pike was sent to explore the southwestern borders between the US and New Spain with the intention to find a trail to bring US commerce into Nuevo México and Nueva Vizcaya (Chihuahua). Pike was captured on 26 February 1807 by the Spanish authorities in northern Nuevo México, who sent him on the Camino Real to the city of Chihuahua for interrogation. While Pike was in this city, he gained access to several maps of México and learned of the discontent with Spanish domination.

In 1821, after 11 years of struggle, Mexico gained its independence from Spain. The Camino Real maintained an important role in this period, since travelers brought communication about the events that were taking place in the center of the country to the towns and villages of the internal provinces. During the Mexican War of Independence, the Camino Real was used by both forces, rebels and royal forces. For example, after the liberator Miguel Hidalgo y Costilla launched the war of independence, he used the road to retreat from the Battle of the Bridge of Calderón fought on the banks of the Calderón River 60 km (37 mi) east of Guadalajara in present-day Zapotlanejo, Jalisco northward, eventually arriving at the Wells of Baján in Coahuila where he was captured and executed by royal forces.

Between 1821 and 1822, after the end of the war for the Independence of Mexico, the Santa Fe Trail was established to connect the US territory of Missouri with Santa Fe. At first, US merchants were arrested and imprisoned for bringing contraband into Mexican territory; however, the growing economic crisis in northern Mexico gave rise to an increased tolerance of this type of trade. In fact, the Santa Fe Trail (Sendero de Santa Fe) provided needed markets for local products (such as cotton) and manufactured products from New Mexico, so New Mexicans looked favorably on this new trade route. By 1827, a lucrative and commercial connection had been forged between Missouri, New Mexico, and Chihuahua.

In 1846, the dispute over the Texas-Mexico border with the United States gave rise to the subsequent invasion by US military forces and the Mexican–American War began. One of these forces was commanded by the general Stephen Kearny, who traveled by the Santa Fe Trail to seize the capital of New Mexico. Another of the forces commanded by Colonel Alexander William Doniphan defeated a small group of Mexican contingents on the Camino Real in the Los Brazitos area south of what is now Las Cruces, New Mexico. Doniphan's forces went on to capture El Paso del Norte and, later, the city of Chihuahua. During 1846–1847, the Camino Real de Tierra Adentro became a path of continuous use, with American forces using it to travel into the interior of Mexico. On their journey, many American travelers kept journals and wrote home about what they saw as they travelled. One of the soldiers provided an estimate of the population of several cities along the Camino, including: Algodones, New Mexico with 1,000 inhabitants; Bernalillo with 500; Sandía Pueblo with 300 to 400, Albuquerque without an estimated number but extant for seven or eight miles along the Rio Grande; Rancho de los Placeres with 200 or 300; Tomé with 2,000; Socorro, described as a "considerable city"; Paso del Norte with 5,000 to 6,000, and Carrizal, Chihuahua with 400 inhabitants. The soldiers even kept notes of the products, prices, and animals that they found on their journeys.

With the Treaty of Guadalupe Hidalgo signed in February 1848, the war officially ended, with Mexico ceding most of its northern territories to the US, including parts of what are now the US states of New Mexico, Colorado, Arizona, and all of California, Nevada and Utah.

Uses of the name 

The name is sometimes a source of confusion, since during the Viceroyalty of New Spain all roads passable by horse and cart were called "Camino Real," and a significant number of roads throughout the viceroyalty bore this designation. Similarly, all of the interior territories outside of Mexico City were once called "Tierra Adentro", and particularly the northern parts of the Kingdom. This is why the portion of the road between Querétaro City and Saltillo was alternatively called "La Puerta de Tierra Adentro" ("The Door of Tierra Adentro"). There have historically been several designated "Caminos Reales de Tierra Adentro" throughout New Spain, perhaps the 2nd most important one after the road to Santa Fe being the one that led out of Saltillo, Coahuila to the Province of Texas.

World Heritage Site 

The section of the road that runs through Mexico was nominated to the UNESCO World Heritage List in November 2001, under the cultural criteria (i) and (ii), which referred to i) "Representing a masterpiece of the creative genius of man"; and ii) "Being the manifestation of a considerable exchange of influences, during a specific period or in a specific cultural area, in the development of architecture or technology, monumental arts, urban planning or landscape design". Criteria (iv) "Offering an eminent example of a type of building, architectural, technological or landscape, that illustrates a significant stage of human history" was added in 2010. On August 1, 2010, UNESCO designated this road as a World Heritage Site.  The designation identified a core zone of 3,102 hectares with a buffer zone of 268,057 hectares distributed across 60 historical sites.

UNESCO identified / recognized 60 sites along the road in their declaration of the road being a World Heritage Site.  Five of them (Mexico City, Querétaro City, Guanajuato City, San Miguel de Allende and Zacatecas) had been separately recognized in the past. The original historical route does not exactly match the route identified by UNESCO, since UNESCO's declaration omitted several sections such as the portion that ran north of Valle de Allende in Chihuahua and the portion that ran through the Hacienda de San Diego del Jaral de Berrio in Guanajuato, as well as the portion in the United States. For this reason, a possible expansion of the declaration has been proposed for the future. The Instituto Nacional de Antropología e Historia is conducting research to find and gather evidence for additional portions and sites of the original stretches of the historical road, such as bridges, pavements, haciendas, etc. that might be added to the original UNESCO designation.

Declared sites

Mexico City and State of Mexico 

1351-000: Historic center of Mexico City.
1351-001: Old College of Templo de San Francisco Javier (Tepotzotlán) in Tepotzotlán.
1351-002: Aculco de Espinoza.
1351-003: Bridge of Atongo.
1351-004: Section of the Camino Real between Aculco de Espinoza and San Juan del Río.

State of Hidalgo 

1351-005: Templo and exconvento de San Francisco in Tepeji del Río de Ocampo and bridge.
1351-006: Section of the Camino Real between the bridge of La Colmena and the Hacienda de La Cañada.

State of Querétaro 

1351-007: Historic center of San Juan del Río.
1351-008: Hacienda de Chichimequillas.
1351-009: Chapel of the hacienda de Buenavista. 
1351-010: Historic center of Querétaro City.

State of Guanajuato 

1351-011: Bridge of El Fraile.
1351-012: Antiguo Real Hospital de San Juan de Dios in San Miguel de Allende. 
1351-013: Bridge of San Rafael in Guanajuato City. 
1351-014: Bridge La Quemada.
1351-015: Sanctuario de Jesús Nazareno de Atotonilco in the Municipality of San Miguel de Allende.
1351-016: Historic center of Guanajuato City and its adjacent mines.

State of Jalisco 

1351-017: Historic center of Lagos de Moreno and bridge.
1351-018: Historic center of Ojuelos de Jalisco.
1351-019: Bridge of Ojuelos de Jalisco. 
1351-020: Hacienda de Ciénega de Mata. 
1351-021: Old Cemetery of Encarnación de Díaz.

State of Aguascalientes 

1351-022: Hacienda de Peñuelas.
1351-023: Hacienda de Cieneguilla.
1351-024: Historic center of Aguascalientes City.
1351-025: Hacienda de Pabellón de Hidalgo.

State of Zacatecas 

1351-026: Chapel of San Nicolás Tolentino of the Hacienda de San Nicolás de Quijas.
1351-027: Town of Pinos.
1351-028: Templo de Nuestra Señora de los Ángeles of the town of Noria de Ángeles.
1351-029: Templo de Nuestra Señora de los Dolores in Villa González Ortega.
1351-030: Colegio de Nuestra Señora de Guadalupe de Propaganda Fide.
1351-031: Historic center of Sombrerete.
1351-032: Templo de San Pantaleón Mártir in the town of Noria de San Pantaleón.
1351-033: Sierra de Órganos.
1351-034: Architectural set of the town of Chalchihuites.
1351-035: Section of the Camino Real between Ojocaliente and Zacatecas.
1351-036: Cave of Ávalos.
1351-037: Historic center of Zacatecas City.
1351-038: Sanctuary of Plateros.

State of San Luis Potosí 

1351-039: Historic center of San Luis Potosí.

State of Durango 

1351-040: Chapel of San Antonio of the Hacienda de Juana Guerra.
1351-041: Churches in the town of Nombre de Dios.
1351-042: Hacienda de San Diego de Navacoyán and Bridge del Diablo.
1351-043: Historic center of the Durango City.
1351-044: Churches in the town of Cuencamé and Cristo de Mapimí.
1351-045: Templo de Nuestra Señora del Refugio in the Hacienda La Pedriceña in Los Cuatillos, Cuencamé Municipality.   
1351-046: Iglesia Principal of the town of San José de Avino.
1351-047: Chapel of the Hacienda de la Inmaculada Concepción of Palmitos de Arriba.
1351-048: Chapel of the Hacienda de la Limpia Concepción of Palmitos de Abajo.
1351-049: Architectural set of Nazas.
1351-050: Town of San Pedro del Gallo.
1351-051: Architectural set of the town of Mapimí.
1351-052: Town of Indé.
1351-053: Chapel of San Mateo of the Hacienda de San Mateo de la Zarca.
1351-054: Hacienda de la Limpia Concepción of Canutillo.
1351-055: Templo de San Miguel in the town of Villa Ocampo.
1351-056: Section of the Camino Real between Nazas and San Pedro del Gallo.
1351-057: Ojuela Mine.
1351-058: Cave of Las Mulas de Molino.

State of Chihuahua 
1351-059: Town of Valle de Allende.

Undeclared historic locations of the Camino Real in State of Chihuahua
 Santa Bárbara 
 Parral
 Chihuahua
 Carrizal
 Laguna de Patos
 Ojo el Lucero
 Puerto Ancho
 Ciudad Juárez
 Senucú
 San Lorenzo
 Misión de Nuestra Señora de Guadalupe
 Presidio del Nuestra Senora del Pilar del Paso del Rio Norte

Location

National Historic Trail

In the United States, from the Texas–New Mexico border to San Juan Pueblo north of Española, the original route (at one point designated U.S. Route 85 but later superseded with US Interstate Highways 10 and 25) has been designated a National Scenic Byway called El Camino Real.

Pedestrian, bicycle, and equestrian trails have been added to portions of the trade route corridor over the past few decades. These include the existing Paseo del Bosque Trail in Albuquerque and portions of the proposed Rio Grande Trail. Its northern terminus, Santa Fe, is also a terminus of the Old Spanish Trail and the Santa Fe Trail.

Along the trail, parajes (stopovers) that have been preserved today include El Rancho de las Golondrinas. Fort Craig and Fort Selden are also located along the trail.

CARTA

The El Camino Real de Tierra Adentro Trail Association (CARTA) is a non-profit trail organization that aims to help promote, educate, and preserve the cultural and historic trail in collaboration with the U.S. National Park Service, the Bureau of Land Management, the New Mexico Department of Cultural Affairs, and various Mexican organizations. CARTA publishes an informative quarterly journal, Chronicles of the Trail, which provides people with further history and current affairs of the trail and what CARTA, as an organization, is doing to help preserve it.

Chihuahua Trail

The Chihuahua Trail is an alternate name used to describe the route as it passes from New Mexico through the state of Chihuahua to central Mexico.

By the late 16th century, Spanish exploration and colonization had advanced from Mexico City northward by the great central plateau to its ultimate goal in Santa Fe. Until Mexican independence in 1821, all communications between New Mexico and the rest of the world were restricted to this  trail. Over it came ox carts and mule trains, missionaries and governors, soldiers and colonists. When the Santa Fe Trail was established as an overland route between Santa Fe and Missouri, traders from the United States extended their operations southward down the Chihuahua Trail and beyond to Durango and Zacatecas. Ultimately superseded by railroads in the 19th century, the ancient Mexico City–Santa Fe road was revived in the mid-20th century as one of the great automobile highways of Mexico. The part that runs from Santa Fe, New Mexico to El Paso, Texas, US State Highway 85, was pioneered by Franciscan missionaries in 1581 and may be the oldest highway in the United States.

See also

Camino Real in New Mexico - El Camino Real de Tierra Adentro  
Camino Real in Texas - El Camino Real de Tierra Adentro  
El Camino Real (California) – the California Mission Trail
El Camino Real de Los Tejas – El Camino Real from Texas east to Louisiana
Old San Antonio Road – a section of El Camino Real de Los Tejas
Scenic byways in the United States
National Register of Historic Places listings in Socorro County, New Mexico

References

Further reading

Dictionary of American History by James Truslow Adams, New York: Charles Scribner's Sons, 1940
Boyle, Susan Calafate. Los Capitalistas: Hispano Merchants and the Santa Fe Trade. Albuquerque: University of New Mexico Press, 1997.
Moorhead, Max L. New Mexico's Royal Road. Norman: University of Oklahoma Press, 1958.
 Palmer, Gabrielle G., et al.. El Camino Real de Tierra Dentro. Santa Fe: Bureau of Land Management, 1993.
Palmer, Gabrielle G. and Stephen L. Fosberg. El Camino Real de Tierra Dentro. Santa Fe: Bureau of Land Management, 1999.
Preston, Douglas and José Antonio Esquibel. The Royal Road. Albuquerque: University of New Mexico Press, 1998.

External links
 National Park Service: official El Camino Real de Tierra Adentro National Historic Trail website
El Camino Real International Heritage Center
El Camino Real de Tierra Adentro – Integrated education curriculum
CARTA – El Camino Real de Tierra Adentro Trail Association: website
N.M.-Monuments.org – "A Road Over Time"

 
Historic trails and roads in Mexico
Historic trails and roads in New Mexico
Historic trails and roads in Texas
Colonial Mexico
Colonial New Mexico
New Spain
Spanish Texas
National Historic Trails of the United States
National Scenic Byways
Bureau of Land Management areas in New Mexico
Historic Civil Engineering Landmarks
Protected areas established in 2000
Units of the National Landscape Conservation System
Roads on the National Register of Historic Places in New Mexico
New Mexico Scenic and Historic Byways
World Heritage Sites in Mexico
National Register of Historic Places in Socorro County, New Mexico
2000 establishments in Texas
2000 establishments in New Mexico
2000 establishments in Mexico